The 1913 Tour de France started with 140 cyclists; there were 51 cyclists distributed over 9 teams, including all favourites for the overall victory. The remaining 89 cyclists started in the isolés category. This edition started with six former Tour de France winners (Louis Trousselier, Lucien Petit-Breton, François Faber, Octave Lapize, Gustave Garrigou and Odile Defraye), the most ever.

Although cyclists had started in teams previously, the rules had forbidden them to work together against other cyclists. In 1913, this changed, and cyclists from the same team were allowed to work together. The organizers preferred riders to ride solo, so they added a rule that if a cyclist would win a stage with a margin of 20 minutes or more, he would not only get his own prize money, but also the half of all the other cyclists' prize money of that stage.

The first African cyclist took part in the Tour de France in 1913: Ali Neffati from Tunisia. Neffati had been discovered by Tour organizer Henri Desgrange, and would later become a driver at l'Auto, the newspaper that organised the Tour de France.

Cyclists

By team

By starting number

By nationality

References

1913 Tour de France
1913